Üyük can refer to:

 Üyük, Çorum
 Üyük, Gölpazarı